Leinbachs is an unincorporated community in southern Bern Township, Pennsylvania, United States, just northwest of Reading and the Reading Regional Airport. it is also located near Blue Marsh Lake. Leinbachs' proximity to these locations has given it significant growth in recent years. Commercial Growth includes the construction of a suburban development, warehouses, and other enterprises.

Recent history
Leinbachs was, until the 1950s, a sparsely populated farming community, located just outside Reading. Since the development of the highway system and the construction of Route 183, Leinbachs has experienced steady growth. It currently is home to the Bern Township Police Department, as well as a community center. Though the population's numbers are included in the Bernville census records, a suburban development was built in 2008. The area is also home to numerous commercial enterprises new to the area, including a Vist Financial bank and a Harley Davidson training and sales facility.

The name "Leinbachs" was acquired since it was the location of a tavern owned by a family named Leinbach. In the 1800s, it was a crossroads stagecoach stop, post office, general store and local tavern. The tavern has been restored into a private residence that stands today.

References

Unincorporated communities in Berks County, Pennsylvania
Unincorporated communities in Pennsylvania